The Bank of Alexandria is one of the largest banks in Egypt, with 210 branches across the country. It has a market share of almost 7% and had assets of 5.2 billion euros (US$6.5 billion) as of June 30, 2006. Intesa Sanpaolo is the major shareholder in the bank. It holds 70.25% of the bank shares, IFC holds 9.75% and the Egyptian Government holds 20%. Mahmoud Abdel Salam Omar, who is a former head of the Egyptian Banks Federation, is a former Chairman of the bank.

History 

 In 1857 local Greek merchants established a Bank of Alexandria to cater to the needs of the Greek merchant community. This bank was liquidated in 1877.
 1864 The English overseas bank, Anglo-Egyptian Bank was founded.
 1924 Anglo Egyptian Bank merged with The Colonial Bank (est. 1836) and the National Bank of South Africa (est. 1891) to form Barclays Bank (Dominion, Colonial and Overseas). Barclays had inherited the ownership of The Colonial Bank when it acquired the London Provincial and South Western Bank  in 1918.
 1957 The Egyptian government founded Bank of Alexandria to take over the Egyptian operations of Barclays Bank DCO, which the Egyptian government had nationalized in 1956 after British and French troops attacked Egypt and occupied the Suez Canal during the Suez crisis.
 1964 Bank of Alexandria acquired Banque du Nile and Import-Export Bank of Egypt.
 October 17, 2006 The Egyptian government privatized Bank of Alexandria. Sanpaolo IMI, the Italian bank which itself was  acquired by Banca Intesa, agreed to pay $1.6 billion for 80% of Bank of Alexandria.  This was the first privatization in Egypt of a fully government-owned bank.

See also
 Entrepreneurship Policies in Egypt

References

External links
Bank of Alexandria website
Zawya Middle East Business Information. Listing of Bank of Alexandria

Banks of Egypt
Banks established in 1957
Intesa Sanpaolo subsidiaries
Egyptian companies established in 1957
Government-owned banks
Government-owned companies of Egypt
Former government-owned companies